is a Japanese actress, model, and news anchor. She appeared in the film Heroine Shikkaku, Kimi ni Todoke, Usagi Drop, and Arakawa Under the Bridge. She also appeared in the drama Andō Lloyd: A.I. knows Love?, Gunshi Kanbei, Hell Teacher Nūbē, and so on. Since 2012 until 2018, she anchors the NTV's news program News Zero every Tuesday. In 2015, she played the lead role in the vampire film Koisuru Vampire and also the lead role in the Netflix original series Atelier.

Filmography

Films

TV dramas

Web dramas
 Teddy Bear (2008), Haruna Suzuki
 Atelier (2015), Mayuko Tokita

Other TV shows
 Mezamashi TV "Hayamimi Trend No.1" (Fuji TV, 2006-2007)
 Gekimote! Seventeen Gakuen (BS-TBS, 2009-2010), MC
 News Zero (NTV, 2012-2018), News Anchor on Tuesday

Stage
 Shin Bakumatsu Junjōden (Theatre Cocoon at Shibuya, July 12, 2012 – July 22, 2012), Sōji Okita
 Hiryūden 21: Satsuriku no Aki (Aoyama Theatre, October 5, 2013 – October 20, 2013), Michiko Kanbayashi

Dubbing
 Kinyō Road Show!: Twilight (NTV, November 12, 2010), Bella Swan

Video games 
 Professor Layton vs. Phoenix Wright: Ace Attorney (Nintendo 3DS, February 26, 2015), Maya Fey/Mayoi Ayasato voice
 Dragon Quest Heroes: Yamiryuu to Sekaiju no Shiro (PlayStation 3, PlayStation 4, February 26, 2015), Meer voice

Music videos
 Hiiragi - "Kakera" (August 26, 2009)
 Kg - "Itoshi Sugite duet with Tiara" (February 3, 2010)

Radio
 Bunka Hōsō Recommen: "Kiritani Mirei no Radio-san." (April 6, 2010 – March 25, 2015, on Wednesday)

Bibliography

Books
 Mirei San no Seikatsu. (Shueisha, August 18, 2009) 
 Mirei San no Seikatsu. super! (Shueisha, January 28, 2011)

Magazines
 Seventeen, Shueisha 1967-, as an exclusive model from April 2006 to December 2011
 Non-no, Shueisha 1971-, as a regular model from March 2012 to June 2015

Photobooks
 Cinema×Kiritani Mirei Making of "Ranhansha and Snow Flake" (Kadokawa Group Publishing, July 29, 2011) 
 Kiritani Mirei 2013 Calendar Photobook (Shueisha, October 12, 2012) 
 First Shasinshū "Shitsuren, Ryokō, Paris." (Kodansha, December 11, 2014)

Discography

Singles 
 Sweet&Bitter (EPIC Records Japan, July 27, 2011)

Awards
 Nail Queen 2014 (Actress Category)

References

External links
  

Japanese film actresses
Japanese stage actresses
Japanese television actresses
Japanese video game actresses
Japanese voice actresses
1989 births
Actors from Chiba Prefecture
Models from Chiba Prefecture
Japanese television personalities
Japanese female models
Japanese gravure models
Living people
21st-century Japanese actresses
Ferris University alumni